The Ambrolauri Museum of Fine Arts was established in 1965, and is located in the regional capital of Racha-Lechkhumi and Kvemo Svaneti in Ambrolauri. The museum houses a collection of paintings and drawings by well-known Georgian artists of the 20th century: Lado Gudiashvili, Elene Akhvlediani, David Kakabadze, Ucha Japaridze, Koba Guruli, Avto Varazi, Levan Tsutskiridze, Natela Iankoshvili, etc. There are 565 stored items. More than 800 visitors visit annually.

Other information 

Total space: 250 m2
Display space: 150 m2
Temporary exhibitions: 25 m2
Storage space: 50 m2

The museum is open every day except Monday from 10:00 to 17:00. The entrance price is 1 GEL for adults and for students and schoolchildren - 0.5 GEL.

External links

References 

Museums in Georgia (country)
Museums established in 1965
Buildings and structures in Racha-Lechkhumi and Kvemo Svaneti
Tourist attractions in Racha-Lechkhumi and Kvemo Svaneti
1965 establishments in Georgia (country)